Son Eun-seo (hangul: 손은서; born Son Ji-yeon, hangul: 손지연, on June 26, 1985) is a South Korean actress.

Personal life 
Son has been in a relationship with Jang Won-seok, CEO of BA Entertainment since the end of 2022.

Filmography

Television series

Web series

Film

Music video

Awards and nominations

References

External links
 
 
 
 

1985 births
Living people
Mystic Entertainment artists
South Korean television actresses
South Korean film actresses
People from Busan
21st-century South Korean actresses